United Nations Security Council resolution 1058, adopted on 30 May 1996, after recalling previous resolutions including resolutions 1027 (1995) and 1046 (1996), the Council extended the mandate of the United Nations Preventive Deployment Force (UNPREDEP) in Macedonia until 30 November 1996.

The UNPREDEP mission played an important role in maintaining peace and stability in Macedonia and the security situation had improved. On 8 April 1996, Macedonia and the Federal Republic of Yugoslavia (Serbia and Montenegro) signed an agreement and both were now called upon to define their common boundary.

All Member States were urged to positively consider requests from the Secretary-General for assistance to be provided to UNPREDEP, requesting the Secretary-General to report by 30 September 1996 on the situation in the country and the strength and mandate of UNPREDEP.

Resolution 1058 was adopted by 14 votes to none against, with one abstention from Russia.

See also
 Bosnian War
 Breakup of Yugoslavia
 Croatian War of Independence
 List of United Nations Security Council Resolutions 1001 to 1100 (1995–1997)
 Macedonia naming dispute
 Yugoslav Wars

References

External links
 
Text of the Resolution at undocs.org

 1058
 1058
1996 in Yugoslavia
1996 in the Republic of Macedonia
 1058
May 1996 events